The 36th Karlovy Vary International Film Festival took place from 5 to 14 July 2001. The Crystal Globe was won by Amélie, a French romantic comedy film directed by Jean-Pierre Jeunet. The second prize, the Special Jury Prize was won by Hi, Tereska, a Polish drama film directed by Robert Gliński. Polish film and theatre director, producer and screenwriter Krzysztof Zanussi was the president of the jury.

Juries
The following people formed the juries of the festival: 
Main competition
 Krzysztof Zanussi, Jury President (Poland)
 Lissy Bellaiche (Denmark)
 Labina Mitevska (Republic of Macedonia)
 Marie-José Nat (France)
 Malti Sahai (India)
 Lee Hall (UK)
 Jan Hřebejk (Czech Republic)
 Jafar Panahi (Iran)
Documentaries
 Erika Gregor, president (Germany)
 Olga Sommerová (Czech Republic)
 Viktor Kossakovskij (Russia)
 Bijidar Manov (Bulgaria)
 Miroljub Vučkovič (Jugoslavia)

Official selection awards

The following feature films and people received the official selection awards:
 Crystal Globe (Grand Prix) - Amélie (Le Fabuleux Destin d'Amélie Poulain) by Jean-Pierre Jeunet (France, Germany)
 Special Jury Prize - Hi, Tereska (Cześć Tereska) by Robert Gliński (Poland)
 Best Director Award - Ibolya Fekete for Chico (Hungary)
 Best Actress Award - Viveka Seldahl for her role in A Song for Martin (En sång för Martin) (Sweden)
 Best Actor Award - Sven Wollter for his role in A Song for Martin (En sång för Martin) (Sweden)
 Special Jury Mention - The Unfinished Song (Qateh-ye natamam) by Maziar Miri (Iran) & Violet Perfume: No One Is Listening (Perfume de violetas, nadie te oye) by Marisa Sistach (Mexico)

Other statutory awards
Other statutory awards that were conferred at the festival:
 Best documentary film (over 30 min.) - Lives (Vies) by Alain Cavalier (France)
 Special Jury Mentions - Women at the Turn of the Century (Trapped) by Helena Třeštíková (Czech Republic) & Pavel Kostomarov for cinematography in Poselenije by Sergei Loznitsa
 Best documentary film (under 30 min.) - Noodle Soup (Pho) by Uyen Luu (Vietnam, UK)
 Crystal Globe for Outstanding Artistic Contribution to World Cinema - Ben Kingsley (UK), Otakar Várva (Czech Republic)
 Award of the Karlovy Vary District - Marie-José Nat (France)
 Award of the Town of Karlovy Vary - Bigas Luna (Spain)
 Audience Award - Shrek by Andrew Adamson & Vicky Jenson (USA)

Non-statutory awards
The following non-statutory awards were conferred at the festival:
 FIPRESCI International Critics Award: Hi, Tereska (Cześć Tereska) by Robert Gliński (Poland)
 FICC - The Don Quixote Prize: Hi, Tereska (Cześć Tereska) by Robert Gliński (Poland)
 Special Mention: Violet Perfume: No One Is Listening (Perfume de violetas, nadie te oye) by Marisa Sistach (Mexico)
 Ecumenical Jury Award: Chico by Ibolya Fekete (Hungary)
 Special Mention: Ghost World by Terry Zwigoff (USA, UK)
 Philip Morris Film Award: A Place in the World (Mesto na zemle) by Artour Aristakisian (Russia)
 NETPAC Award: Under the Skin of the City (Zir-e poost-e shahr) Rakhshan Bani-E'temad (Iran)
 Special Mention: Firefly Dreams (Ichiban utsukushî natsu) by John Williams (Japan)
 Best Student Film: Nelásky (Unhappy) by Tomáš Bařina (Czech Republic)
 Special Mention: The Devouring Eyes by Syllas Tzoumerkas (Greece)

References

2001 film awards
Karlovy Vary International Film Festival